USS Melvin may refer to the following ships operated by the United States Navy:

United States Navy ship names